Couleur 3 is the third radio station operated by RTS Radio Télévision Suisse. The station was launched in 1982.

It can be received in French-speaking Switzerland and in the canton of Bern on FM. The literal translation of the name is ‘Colour 3”.

Notes and references

See also 
 Radio suisse romande
 120 secondes

External links

1982 establishments in Switzerland
Radio stations established in 1982
French-language radio stations in Switzerland